Gregory Thomas Laden is an American biological anthropologist and science blogger.

Education
Born in 1958, Laden received his B.A. from the University of the State of New York's Regents College program in 1984, and his M.A. and Ph.D. from Harvard University in 1987 and 1992, respectively, where he was advised by Irven DeVore.

Career
Laden has taught at multiple institutions, including, but not limited to, Harvard, the University of Minnesota, and Century College. In 1999, when he was on the faculty of the University of Minnesota, he co-authored a study in Current Anthropology that found that the practice of humans cooking food evolved because it allowed them to cook vegetables. He published a blog, "Greg Laden's Blog", on ScienceBlogs, where he focused on public controversies regarding multiple scientific topics, including global warming and evolution.

References

1958 births
Living people
American anthropologists
Science bloggers
University of Minnesota faculty
Harvard University alumni
SUNY Regents College alumni
Physical anthropologists